Herceg is a Croatian surname.

It is one of the most common surnames in the Krapina-Zagorje County of Croatia.

It is presumably derived from the title of Herceg.

People with the name include:

 Antun Herceg (born 1927), Serbian football player
 Danko Herceg (born 1974), Croatian canoeist
 Ivan Herceg (disambiguation), multiple people
 Mirko Herceg (born 1992), Bosnian handball player

See also
 Erceg

References

Croatian surnames